The Exhibition Road Courtyard (named as Sackler Courtyard between 2017 and 2022, then appearing as Exhibition Road Courtyard on maps) is a public courtyard that serves as an entrance to the Victoria & Albert Museum in London. It is part of the V&A Exhibition Road Quarter entrance and expansion of the Museum, completed in 2017 and designed by architectural practice AL_A, the firm of architect Amanda Levete.

The courtyard opens out onto the street (Exhibition Road) through a perforated entrance gate. It's made of 11,000 handmade tiles, a reference to the V&A's heritage as a world-leader in ceramic study, collection and preservation. It is the world's first porcelain public courtyard, and special purpose non-slip porcelain tiles had to be created for the project. The courtyard also features a cafe and an oculus, with view down into the new performance hall of the Museum below.

Controversial name 

The courtyard was named Sackler Courtyard after the Sackler family, associated with the Purdue Pharma company accused of fuelling the opioid crisis in the US. Theresa Sackler, the chair of the Sackler Trust, sat on the V&A's board of trustees at the time the Courtyard was opened.

In 2019 US photographer and activist Nan Goldin and her group P.A.I.N.(Prescription Addiction Intervention Now) held their first anti-Sackler performance protest outside of the United States at this place in London, demanding that the museum “abandon the Sackler name”, remove signage at the institution linked to the family and stop receiving donations. Goldin led a group of 30 demonstrators in placing bottles of pills and red-stained “Oxy dollar” bills on the courtyard's tiled floor.

In 2022 the Museum bowed to the pressure and removed the name. No new name was announced at the time for the courtyard, but 2023 maps of the museum show the name Exhibition Road Courtyard in it.

References

Victoria and Albert Museum
Squares in the Royal Borough of Kensington and Chelsea
Sackler family
Porcelain rooms